The Political Language of Islam (1988) by  Bernard Lewis is a work in the contemporary, scholarly understanding of the relationship between Islam and politics and in the contemporary, scholarly understanding of the political realities of predominantly Muslim countries and, to a lesser extent, of countries with large Muslim communities.

Classic Islamic thought recognized no separation between church and state.  According to Lewis, the idea of the secular only began to enter the political thought of Muslim countries and communities in the 19th century.

References

Books by Bernard Lewis
History books about Islam
1988 non-fiction books